Garrett's Almshouses are Grade II listed almshouses on Wood Street, Chipping Barnet. The houses were constructed in 1729.

References

External links
 

Grade II listed buildings in the London Borough of Barnet
Houses in the London Borough of Barnet
Almshouses in London
Wood Street, Chipping Barnet